Lakdi ka pul is one of the oldest suburbs in Hyderabad, India.

Etymology
The area got its name from a bridge that was made of wooden blocks. Lakdi ka means "made of wood" and Pul means "bridge" in Hindi and Urdu.

Transport
Lakdikapul is well connected by road to other parts of the city. TSRTC runs its buses through the area.

The Lakdikapul railway station on the MMTS is located nearby. It is also served by the Lakdi-ka-pul metro station on the Red Line of the Hyderabad Metro. Bkkkk  bsdk

References

Neighbourhoods in Hyderabad, India